Bilari may refer to:

 Bilari, a town in Moradabad district, Uttar Pradesh, India
 Bilari (Assembly constituency), an assembly constituency in the town
 Bilari, Gorakhpur district, a village in Gorakhpur district
 Bilari, Iran, a village in Poshtkuh Rural District, Iran